Ihor Mykolayovich Kutyepov (born 17 December 1965 in Kharkiv Oblast) is a former Ukrainian soccer player. He became the first goalie of Ukraine national football team.

Career
He was born in the city of Pervomaiskyi. Ihor played as a goalie. He earned two international wins (2–0–2, W–D–L) with 1.50 Goals Against Average (GAA). After his retirement he coached goalkeepers in PFC CSKA Moscow.

Honours
 Ukrainian Premier League champion: 1993, 1994, 1997.
 Ukrainian Cup winner: 1993, 1996.
 Russian Premier League runner-up: 1998.
 Soviet Cup winner: 1988.

References

External links
  Short career overview at ukrsoccerhistry.com, photo included.
 Short bio
 Ihor Kutyepov. Football Federation of Ukraine (official statistics)

1965 births
Living people
People from Pervomaiskyi
Ukrainian footballers
Soviet footballers
Ukraine international footballers
FC Dynamo Kyiv players
FC Metalist Kharkiv players
FC Rostov players
FC Tyumen players
PFC CSKA Moscow players
Russian Premier League players
Ukrainian Premier League players
Ukrainian expatriate footballers
Expatriate footballers in Russia
Ukrainian expatriate sportspeople in Russia
Association football goalkeepers
Sportspeople from Kharkiv Oblast